HMS Druid was a  wooden screw corvette built for the Royal Navy in the late 1860s. She spent her service life overseas on the Cape of Good Hope and North America and West Indies Stations and was sold for scrap in 1886.

Design and description
The ship displaced  and had a burthen of 1,322 tons. Her crew consisted of 220 officers and ratings.

Druid had a two-cylinder horizontal steam engine, built by Maudslay, Sons and Field, driving a single  propeller. The ship carried  of coal. Although no information is available on her range, Admiral G. A. Ballard estimated that Druid had only about two-thirds the range of her sisters, despite the additional coal that she carried, due to the greater efficiency of the compound expansion engines used in the other ships.

The lower masts were made of iron, and the other masts were wood. Ballard attributed the class's poor performance under sail to the drag of the propeller, which could neither be hoisted out of the water, nor feathered. He also attributed their sluggish steering under sail to interference with the flow of water to the rudder by the stationary propeller. The ship was re-rigged as a barque after her first commission.

Druid was initially armed with a mix of 7-inch and 64-pounder 71 cwt rifled muzzle-loading guns. The eight 64-pounder guns were mounted on the broadside while the two  guns were mounted on the forecastle and poop as chase guns. After the completion of their first commissions, the two ships were rearmed with a total of fourteen lighter 64-cwt 64-pounder guns, two of which replaced the 7-inch guns as chase guns.

Service

Druid  was laid down in 1868 and launched on 13 March 1869 in the presence of Princess Louise and Prince Arthur. She was completed in February 1872 and was the last ship to be built at Deptford Dockyard. 

The ship was initially assigned to the Cape of Good Hope Station, commanded by Captain the Honorable Maurice Nelson, where she remained for two years before being transferred to the North America and West Indies Station. Druid was refitted upon her return home in December 1876, which included rearmament. The ship recommissioned in February 1879 and returned to the North American Station. She returned home in September 1882 and was paid off. Druid was laid up in the Medway until she was sold for breaking up to Castle of Charlton on 10 November 1886.

Notes

Footnotes

Bibliography

External links 
 
Druid at William Loney website
Druid at the Naval Database website

1869 ships
Corvettes of the Royal Navy
Ships built in Deptford
Victorian-era corvettes of the United Kingdom